Tyrone Gabriel Loran (born 29 June 1981) is a former footballer who played as a defender. He won five caps for Netherlands Antilles in 2008.

Starting his career with Volendam in 2000; two years later he moved to England to play for Manchester City. The next year he transferred to Tranmere Rovers following a successful loan spell. In 2005, he played for Port Vale on loan, before returning to his homeland to sign for RBC. Two years later he moved on to NAC Breda. After four years with Breda he joined De Graafschap in 2011.

Club career
Loran started his career at Dutch second-tier club FC Volendam in 2000. In April 2002, he had a trial at English Premier League side Manchester City, and was signed permanently in August for £60,000. He never made a competitive first team appearance during his season with the club. In December 2002, he left for Tranmere Rovers on loan, and signed a permanent deal with Rovers in May 2003 as the club paid City an undisclosed fee.

Described as a "destroyer" by manager Ray Mathias, he missed three months from late December 2003 to March 2004, due to a knee injury that required surgery. In the 2003–04 season, after he played just two games from the start of season, he left for Port Vale on loan in December 2004. Vale attempted to sign him permanently, but instead he returned to Holland to sign for RBC of the Eredivisie in January 2005.

At the end of 2004–05, his club were in the relegation play-offs, but managed to stay in the top-fight after winning the play-offs. However a last place finish in 2005–06 ensured their relegation to the Eerste Divisie. The next season he made 34 appearances and helped Roosendaal back to the top-flight as Eerste Divisie champions.

In the summer of 2007 he joined NAC Breda on a free transfer. He made fourteen appearances in 2007–08, as Breda finished third to qualify for the UEFA Intertoto Cup. He made 26 appearances in 2008–09, helping the club to once again qualify for Europe. He played just nine games in 2009–10, as Breda finished in mid-table. Following ten appearances in 2010–11, he joined league rivals De Graafschap in January 2011, making a further seven appearances for his new club before the end of the campaign.

International career
An international for the now defunct Netherlands Antilles side, he helped the nation qualify through the 2010 FIFA World Cup qualification – CONCACAF First Round by scoring a goal against group opponents Nicaragua. In the Second Round the Antilles lost out to Haiti. His international career was ended by the dissolution of the Netherlands Antilles.

Career statistics

Club statistics

International statistics

Honours
RBC Roosendaal
Eerste Divisie: 2006–07

References

1981 births
Living people
Footballers from Amsterdam
Curaçao footballers
Dutch footballers
Dutch Antillean footballers
Netherlands Antilles international footballers
Association football defenders
FC Volendam players
Dutch Antillean expatriate footballers
Expatriate footballers in England
Manchester City F.C. players
Tranmere Rovers F.C. players
Port Vale F.C. players
RBC Roosendaal players
NAC Breda players
De Graafschap players
Eerste Divisie players
English Football League players
Eredivisie players